The Broxbourne Council election, 1996 was held to elect council members of the Broxbourne Borough Council, the local government authority of the borough of Broxbourne, Hertfordshire, England.

Composition of expiring seats before election

Election results

Results summary 
An election was held in 14 wards on 2 May 1996.

The Labour Party gained 3 seats at the expense of the Conservative Party by recording gains in Cheshunt North Ward, Rye Park Ward and Wormley Turnford Ward.

The political balance of the new council following this election was:

Conservative 24 seats
Labour 14 seats
Liberal Democrat 4 seats

Ward results

References

1996
1996 English local elections
1990s in Hertfordshire